Helium is the second album by English post-rock band Pram, released in September 1994 through Too Pure.

Reception 

The Vinyl District reviewed the album positively, stating that "the band’s playing is as urgent and vibrant as it is carefully assembled [...] Pram had become progressively more comfortable with the technology and the offbeat instruments at their fingertips." AllMusic noted that the album's musical elements—"Moog burblings, exotic rhythms, and cool-toned horns—are more typically the building blocks of lounge music, but Pram is instead all about uneasy listening, cutting and pasting schizophrenic sound collages topped off by Rosie Cuckston's unnerving vocals."

In 2016, Fact ranked Helium at number 29 on its list of the best post-rock albums.

Track listing

Personnel 
Rosie Cuckston – vocals, keyboards
Matt Eaton – guitar, bass guitar, keyboards, sampler
Sam Owen – bass guitar, guitar, keyboards, backing vocals
Max Simpson – keyboards, sampler
Daren Garratt – drums, percussion
Verdigris – horns

References

External links 
 

1994 albums
Pram (band) albums
Too Pure albums